Latvia–Taiwan relations, also retroactively known as ROC–Latvian relations date back to August 16, 1923, when the Republic of China recognized Latvia de jure, in that period when the island of Taiwan was under Japanese colonial rule. After the Soviet occupation of Latvia in 1940, the ROC is one of the few countries that did not recognize Latvia's incorporation into the Soviet Union.

After restoring its independence in 1991, Latvia pursued an ambiguous policy towards the issue of China, at one point in 1991 and 1992 briefly having established relations with both the ROC and the People's Republic of China, until the PRC froze ties with Latvia in 1992. This policy was allegedly due to Latvian desires of receiving development aid from Taiwan, which, however, did not materialize. This, coupled with changes in the Latvian government and other factors, led to the establishment of full diplomatic ties with the PRC and the closure of the consulate-general of the ROC in Riga in 1994. Ever since, Taiwan is represented by the Taipei Mission in the Republic of Latvia.

Today, bilateral relations include economic ties, a visa-free travel regime and the support of some Latvian parliamentarians towards the participation of the ROC in organizations such as the World Health Organization.

See also
 Foreign relations of Latvia
 Foreign relations of Taiwan
 Lithuania–Taiwan relations

References

External links 
Taipei Economic and Cultural Office in Latvia

Bilateral relations of Taiwan
Taiwan